Real Oviedo is a Spanish football club based in Oviedo, in the autonomous community of Asturias. Founded on 26 March 1926 as a result of the merger of two clubs who had maintained a large sporting rivalry for years in the city: Real Stadium Club Ovetense and Real Club Deportivo Oviedo.

Honours

National titles
La Liga
 Third place (3): 1934–35, 1935–36, 1962–63
Segunda División
 Winners (5): 1932–33, 1951–52, 1957–58, 1971–72, 1974–75
 Runners-up (3): 1931–32, 1954-55, 1955-56
Copa de la Liga (Segunda División)
 Winners: 1984–85
Segunda División B
 Winners: 2014–15
Tercera División 
 Winners (4): 2003–04, 2004–05, 2007–08, 2008–09

Regional titles
Asturian Championship: 
Real Stadium Ovetense  1924-25
Real Oviedo 1927-28, 1928-29, 1931-32, 1932-33, 1933-34, 1934-35, 1935-36

Friendly tournaments 
Trofeo Emma Cuervo (15) : 1953, 1958, 1965, 1966, 1969, 1973, 1978, 1986, 1988, 1989, 1992, 1996, 2001, 2004, 2011
Trofeo Ciudad de Oviedo (8) : 1982, 1984, 1985, 1987, 1988, 1991, 1992, 1995
Trofeo Principado (6) : 1989, 1990, 1992, 1995, 1996, 2007
Trofeo Aniceto Campa (5) : 2007, 2008, 2010, 2011, 2012 
Memorial Belarmino Arbesú (3) : 2009, 2010, 2011 
Trofeo Costa Verde (2) : 1964, 1974
Trofeo Ciudad de Santander (2) : 1977, 1979
Trofeo Conde de Fontao (2) : 1978, 1979
Trofeo Ramón Losada (2) : 2006, 2014
Trofeo Treycar (2) : 2007, 2009
Trofeo Juan Acuña : 1989
Trofeo Alcarria: 2000
Memorial Pedro Alberto : 2008
Trofeo Villa de Laredo : 2011
Trofeo Ayuntamiento de Navia : 2012
Trofeo Vallecas: 2015

Individual Honours

Pichichi Trophy
In Spanish football, the Pichichi is the trophy awarded by Spanish sports newspaper 'Marca' to the top goalscorer for each league season.
La Liga: Isidro Lángara (3) (1933–34, 1934–35, 1935–36), Marianín (1972–73)
Segunda División: Isidro Lángara (1932–33), Eduardo Gómez "Lalo" (1957–58), Galán (1971–72), Carlos (1987–88)
Segunda División B: Miguel Linares (2014–15)
Tercera División: Diego Cervero (3) (2004–05, 2007–08, 2008–09)

Zamora Trophy
Segunda División: Óscar Álvarez (2) (1931–32, 1932–33), Lombardía (1971–72)
Tercera División: Rafael Ponzo (2003–04), Oinatz Aulestia (2008–09)

Players

Most appearances

Goalscorers

Managers

Most appearances

References

External links
 Real Oviedo: su historia en números

Records And Statistics
Real Oviedo
Association football lists by Spanish club